Giovanni Scalzo (born 17 March 1959) is an Italian fencer. He won a gold medal in the team sabre event at the 1984 Summer Olympics and two bronze medals at the 1988 Summer Olympics.

References

External links
 

1959 births
Living people
Italian male fencers
Olympic fencers of Italy
Fencers at the 1984 Summer Olympics
Fencers at the 1988 Summer Olympics
Fencers at the 1992 Summer Olympics
Olympic gold medalists for Italy
Olympic bronze medalists for Italy
Olympic medalists in fencing
Sportspeople from Messina
Medalists at the 1984 Summer Olympics
Medalists at the 1988 Summer Olympics
Universiade medalists in fencing
Universiade gold medalists for Italy
Medalists at the 1981 Summer Universiade
Medalists at the 1983 Summer Universiade